Asselby is a village and civil parish in the East Riding of Yorkshire, England. It is located in the south-west of the county, north of the River Ouse.
The land surrounding Asselby is very flat and intersected by dykes which drain into the Rivers Derwent and Ouse.

History

Asselby is mentioned in the Domesday Book as belonging to Cuthbert, the Bishop of Durham. The name derives from Old Norse - the By of Askil, meaning the famstead of Askil. Historically in the wapentake of Howdenshire, and in the Parish of Howden, it is now in its own civil parish. The civil parish is formed by the village of Asselby and the hamlet of Knedlington, together with that part of Boothferry village west of the B1228 road. According to the 2011 UK census, Asselby parish had a population of 351, a rise from the 2001 UK census figure of 299.

The Hull and Barnsley Railway ran past the village until 1955, having a level crossing named 'Asselby'. The closest station was Barmby railway station.

The village has one pub, The Black Swan, situated on Main Street. Unusually, Asselby is situated on an entirely dead-end road, which finishes in the next village (which is slightly larger than Asselby), Barmby on the Marsh.

Northern Gas Networks has a gas pressure reduction and odourisation plant just outside of Asselby.

Asselby Island

South of the village, on the banks of the River Ouse is Asselby Island. Changes in the tidal system meant that the northern channel had almost dried up by the 1940s, and draining by the Ministry of Agriculture, Fisheries and Food, in the 1960s, mean that the island now only has water on the western and southern sides, its northern side being now permanently joined to the northern bank of the river. However, in times of high water, the island does become a true island again.

The island is now a Site of Interest for Nature Conservation (SINC), particularly for invertebrates. Historically, the island belonged to the Parish of Drax, but it now belongs entirely with the civil parish of Asselby. The Trans-Pennine Trail on the northern bank of the Ouse affords views of the island.

Location grid

References

External links 

 

Villages in the East Riding of Yorkshire
Civil parishes in the East Riding of Yorkshire